Brian Clegg may refer to:

Brian Clegg (footballer) (born 1930), Australian rules footballer
Brian Clegg (writer) (born 1955), British author and popular science writer